Berezovka is a rural locality (a village) in Suzemsky District, Bryansk Oblast, Russia. The population was 76 as of 2010. There are 3 streets.

Geography 
Berezovka is located 18 km north of Suzemka (the district's administrative centre) by road. Stuzhenka is the nearest rural locality.

References 

Rural localities in Suzemsky District